Korotych is an urban-type settlement in Kharkiv Raion of Kharkiv Oblast in Ukraine. It is essentially a western suburb of the city of Kharkiv, part of Kharkiv agglomeration. Korotych belongs to Pisochyn settlement hromada, one of the hromadas of Ukraine. Population:

Economy

Transportation
Korotych railway station, located in the settlement, is on the railway connecting Kharkiv with Poltava and Sumy. There is intensive suburban passenger traffic.

The settlement is included in the road network of Kharkiv urban agglomeration. In particular, the northern boundary of Korotych is Highway M03 which connects Kharkiv with Kyiv.

References

Urban-type settlements in Kharkiv Raion